Leften Stavros Stavrianos (1913 – March 23, 2004) was a Greek-Canadian historian. His most influential books are considered to be A Global History: From Prehistory to the 21st Century and The Balkans since 1453. He was one of the first historians to challenge Orientalist views of the Ottoman Empire.

Biography 
Stavrianos was born in Vancouver, British Columbia, Canada in 1913.  He received a B.A. in history from the University of British Columbia, and a M.A. and Ph.D. from Clark University in Worcester, Massachusetts.

Stavrianos joined the faculty of Queen's University in Kingston, Ontario and Smith College in Northampton, Massachusetts. He then became a professor at Northwestern University in 1946.  After retiring from Northwestern in 1973, Stavrianos joined the University of California, San Diego Department of History until 1992.

Bibliography 
 
 

Chronological list
 The Movement for Balkan Unity to 1912 (1937 Clark University dissertation)
 Balkan Federation: A History of the Movement toward Balkan Unity in Modern Times (1942, 1944)
 First Balkan Alliance System, 1860-1876 (1942)
 Greece: The War and Aftermath ... (1945)
 Greece: American Dilemma and Opportunity (1952)
 The Ottoman Empire: Was It the Sick Man of Europe? (1957, 3rd ed. 1966)
 Antecedents to the Balkan Revolutions of the Nineteenth Century (1957)
 The Balkans Since 1453 (1958, 2nd ed. 2000, 4th ed. 2008)
 A Global History of Man (1962) (with many co-authors)
 Readings in World History (1962, 3rd ed. 1970)
 The Balkans, 1815-1914 (Holt, Rinehart and Winston, 1963). 
 The Soviet Union: A Culture Area in Perspective (1964)
 Sub-Saharan Africa: A Culture in Perspective (1964) (with Loretta Kreider Andrews)
 Latin America: A Culture Area in Perspective (1965) (with George I. Blankenstein)
 India: A Culture Area in Perspective (1966) (with Lacey Baldwin Smith)
 China: A Culture Area in Perspective (1966) (with Roger F. Hackett)
 The Middle East: A Culture Area in Perspective (1966)
 The World Since 1500: A Global History (1966)
 The Epic of Modern Man: A Collection of Readings (Pearson, 1966; 2nd ed. 1971). 
 The Epic of Man to 1500: A Collection of Readings (1970)
 The World to 1500: A Global History (Pearson, 1970; 3rd ed. 1983; 7th ed. 1999). 
 Man's Past and Present: A Global History (Prentice Hall, 1971). 
 The World of Mankind: Man the Toolmaker (1973)
 The Promise of the Coming Dark Age (1976)
 Global Rift: The Third World Comes of Age (Morrow, 1981) 
 Lifelines from Our Past: A New World History (Routledge, 1989, rev. ed. 1997).

References

External links 
 Kevin Reilly remembers L.S. Stavrianos
 

1913 births
2004 deaths
Historians of the Balkans
Canadian male non-fiction writers
Canadian people of Greek descent
Northwestern University faculty
Academic staff of the Queen's University at Kingston
Smith College faculty
University of California, San Diego faculty
Writers from Vancouver
Clark University alumni
University of British Columbia alumni
20th-century Canadian historians
Canadian expatriates in the United States
World historians